= Aghbargai Khullah =

Aghbargai Khullah اغبرگئی خللہ
- Location within Pakistan
- Coordinates: 32.40°N 69.95°E
- Country: Pakistan
- Territory: Federally Administered Tribal Areas
- Elevation: 1,190 m (3,900 ft)
- Time zone: UTC+5 (PST)
  - Summer (DST): UTC+6 (PDT)

Aghbargai Khullah (Urdu: اغبرگئی خللہ) is a town in the Federally Administered Tribal Areas of Pakistan. It is located at 32°23'46N 69°56'51E with an altitude of 1190 metres (3907 feet).
